Link TV, originally WorldLink TV, is a non-commercial American satellite television network providing what it describes as "diverse perspectives on world and national issues."  It is carried nationally on DirecTV (ch. 375) and Dish Network (ch. 9410). Link TV was launched as a daily, 24-hour non-commercial network on December 15, 1999. It receives no money from the satellite providers, but relies instead on contributions from viewers and foundations.

Link TV broadcasts a mix of documentaries, global and national news, music of diverse cultures, and programs promoting citizen action. The network also airs English language news from Al Jazeera English, Deutsche Welle, NHK and France 24, as well as various documentaries and world music videos. Select Link TV programs are streamed on the Internet, via the channel's website.

The network also produced Mosaic: World News from the Middle East, a program of translated news reports from the Middle East.

History
Direct satellite broadcasters were mandated to set aside 4% of its channel space for noncommercial educational and informational programming. ITVS, Internews Network and Internews Interactive joined in forming Link Media Inc. to program a channel, WorldLink TV, for this mandate. WorldLink TV was one of the nine channels select to meet the mandate for DirecTV.

In October 2012, Link TV announced that it was merging with KCET, an independent public television station in Los Angeles, to form a new nonprofit entity, to be called KCETLink. The entity was headquartered at KCET's Burbank facilities. In 2018, KCETLink merged with the KOCE-TV Foundation to form the Public Media Group of Southern California.

The channel will be removed from the DirecTV lineup on January 15, 2023, as Link TV has chosen not to renew its yearly public interest contract with the satellite provider.

Production and projects 
In 2010, Link TV announced the launch of ViewChange.org, an online video platform funded by the Bill & Melinda Gates Foundation that aims to raise awareness of global development issues. It applies Semantic Web technology to video, in order to automatically create links to related content from other online sources.

In conjunction with the New York City Human Rights Watch International Film Festival, LinkTV broadcast a "Youth Producing Change" program which showcases the works of youth from all over the world.  They also support efforts to fund groups such as imMEDIAte Justice Productions which help youth create their own film works.

Production facilities for Link TV are in San Francisco, Washington, D.C. and Burbank, California.

Programs

Original 
 Mosaic: World News from the Middle East
 Mosaic Intelligence Report
 Global Pulse
 Latin Pulse
 CINEMONDO
 Global Spirit
 Explore
 Earth Focus
 Who Speaks for Islam
 Bridge to Iran
 Real Conversations
 Global Lens
 Oceans 8
 DOC-DEBUT
 4REAL
 Men of Words
 Lunch with Bokara
 Bokara's Conversations on Consciousness
 U.S.-Muslim Engagement Project
 Ethics and the World Crisis
 ColorLines
 Future Express
 Connections
 The Israel Lobby
 Youth Producing Change
 LinkAsia

Licensed 
 DW News
 Borgen
 France 24 World News
 Democracy Now!
 In Focus (Deutsche Welle)
 Newshour (Al Jazeera English)
 NHK Newsline
 Sleepless in Gaza...and Jerusalem
 TED Talks
 Arab Labor
 Rappers, Divas, Virtuosos: New Music From the Muslim World
 bro'Town

Affiliates
 KCET
 KOCE-TV
 KRCB 1 a.m. to 5 a.m.

See also 
 United States cable news
 List of United States over-the-air television networks
 List of United States cable and satellite television networks
 List of independent television stations in the U.S.

References

External links 

1999 establishments in the United States
Television networks in the United States
Commercial-free television networks
English-language television stations in the United States
Progressivism in the United States
Organizations based in San Francisco
Television channels and stations established in 1999
24-hour television news channels in the United States
Peabody Award winners